Schüssel government may refer to two government cabinets in Austria:

 the First Schüssel government (2000–2003)
 the Second Schüssel government (2003–2007)